Signor Lawanda (August 7, 1849 - 14 November 1934 ) born Hugh David Evans, was a nineteenth-century circus performer and strongman renowned for his strength.

Biography

Born Hugh David Evans in Bethlehem, Pennsylvania, his mother died two weeks after his birth due to puerperal sepsis. Evans was put to work as a child laborer in the slate mines of Pennsylvania and in Granville, New York. Coming from several generations of slate miners in Northern Wales on his father's side, his mother was a Pennsylvania German woman who was famed for her feats of strength in her Bethlehem neighborhood. One of her feats was reportedly lifting a 375-pound barrel of flour and carrying it up a flight of stairs. (George W Stark Detroit News)

Evans was first introduced to the circus at 11 years old, when he attended the circus with his father in Rutland, Vermont. From then on it was in his blood to be a circus strongman. He practiced his feats of strength at home and would lift the heavy bundles of slate in the Quarries he worked in. Men would come from all around to challenge him at lifting the heavy bundles. By the time he was 16 years old, he was defeating all challengers.

Evans left home in 1865 with a man named Comical Brown to barnstorm in the eastern United States. His father was mortified at a son of his becoming a show performer. As part of his act in his trouping days, Evans would lift a barrel of water and let four men climb astride it, weighing approximately 1000 pounds. He also would juggle a 35-pound chair, toss it in the air, somersaulting it several times, then catch it with his teeth. If someone would donate a silver dollar, he would bite it in half within a couple of minutes. He amazed circus goers and astounded P.T. Barnum by lifting a 1400 lb horse with his teeth. (Detroit Free Press November 15, 1934)

In June 1882 while performing in Boston, Massachusetts at Forest Gardens, Evans became ensnared in a confrontation with John L. Sullivan, then the heavyweight champ. Evans out-lifted Sullivan by hoisting a barrel filled with water, weighing approximately 375-490 lbs, using one arm. His opponent was unable to lift the barrel and wanted to fight afterwards, but years later they became friends. Signor Lawanda worked for Dan Rice Circus among many other circus, he settled in Detroit Michigan and worked for  E.W. Pop Wiggins traveling across the country and into Canada, he worked for the Wonderland theatre at the end of his career, which was a theatre in Detroit at Woodward and Jefferson. Evans died on November 14, 1934 in Detroit, Michigan.

Family
Evans's family consisted of his father David Robert Evans, stepmother Mary, sisters Jane, Hannah, Catherine, Ann, and brothers James David and Robert. Hugh married a Canadian farmer's daughter, Nellie McAleer, in January 1880 in Detroit, Michigan, and they had four sons - George, twins Fred and Frank Evans and John Evans(Lawanda)Son and owner of Globe bottling company in Detroit, Michigan.

References

New York Times 11-14-1934
Detroit Free Press 11-15-1934, 06-03-1934
Detroit News 11-15-1934, 03-07-1941, 03-15-1941
The Billboard 06-14-1930
 Circus Route Book 1892 season

Sources
Evans Family
Grandson of Enoch "Pop" Wiggins (witness)

1849 births
1934 deaths
American strength athletes
Circus strongmen and strongwomen
People associated with physical culture
Sportspeople from Bethlehem, Pennsylvania